Kurt Patrick Wise (born 1959) is an American young Earth creationist who serves as the Director of Creation Research Center at Truett McConnell University in Cleveland, Georgia. He has a PhD in Geology from Harvard University. He writes in support of creationism and contributed to the Creation Museum in Petersburg, Kentucky.

Biography
In 1989, Wise earned a Ph.D. in geology from Harvard University under the supervision of Stephen Jay Gould. In addition, he has an M.A. in geology from Harvard University and a B.A. in geology from the University of Chicago. In 1998, Robert Schadewald described Wise as influential on "modern creationism as it is practiced at its higher levels."

Starting in fall 2009 he has been the director of Truett McConnell University's newly created Creation Research Center in Cleveland, Georgia. Between August 2006 and May 2009 he taught at Southern Baptist Theological Seminary as director of the school's Center for Theology and Science, a job in which he was preceded by intelligent design advocate William Dembski. He had previously taught at Bryan College in Dayton, Tennessee where he served as Director of the Center for Origins Research and as an Associate Professor of Science for seventeen years.

He served as consultant to the Answers in Genesis Creation Museum which opened in 2007. Timothy H. Heaton, another scientist who studied under Stephen Jay Gould, knows Wise as "a less propaganda-oriented creationist" than Ken Ham, the leader of Answers in Genesis, and said that Wise's influence on the displays was apparent.

Views and criticism
Wise has said he believes, according to a literal reading of the Bible, "that the Earth is young, and the universe is young, I would suggest that it's less than ten thousand years in age."  He believes that science can be used to support and demonstrate these claims.  Despite believing that science supports his position, Wise has written that:

As a young child interested in science, Wise tentatively adopted an old Earth creationist point of view after doing a science fair project on the geologic column, but was not completely satisfied with that decision:

Later, as a sophomore in high school, he took a newly purchased Bible and a pair of scissors and cut out every verse which could not be interpreted literally if scientific determinations on the age of the Earth and evolution were true.  He pursued this task with a flashlight under the covers of his bed for several months; at the end, he had removed so much material that "with the cover of the Bible taken off, I attempted to physically lift the Bible from the bed between two fingers. Yet, try as I might, and even with the benefit of intact margins throughout the pages of Scripture, I found it impossible to pick up the Bible without it being rent in two."  Wise decided to reject evolution instead of Biblical literalism, deciding:

Biologist and popular atheist author Richard Dawkins called Wise an honest creationist because he is willing to accept creationism even if he admitted "all the evidence in the universe" was against it.

Further, in his book The God Delusion, Dawkins referred to Wise's denial of science over creationism:

Books
 Kurt Wise, Faith, Form, and Time: What the Bible Teaches and Science Confirms About Creation and the Age of the Universe. B&H Publishing Group, 2002. 
 Kurt Wise and Sheila A. Richardson, Something from Nothing: Understanding What You Believe About Creation and Why. (B&H Publishing Group, January 2004)

References

1959 births
Living people
Baptists from the United States
American Christian Young Earth creationists
Harvard Graduate School of Arts and Sciences alumni
People from Cleveland, Georgia
Southern Baptist Theological Seminary faculty
University of Chicago alumni